Yair Yint Aung (also spelled Ye Yint Aung, born 18 August 1993) is a Burmese singer-songwriter and actor. He is considered one of the most successful Burmese singers and rose to fame with his album "A Mone Diary".

Early life and education
Yair Yint Aung was born on 18 August 1993 in Yangon, Myanmar. He is the only son of Soe Lwin, a sailor and his wife May Soe Myint. He attended Basic Education High School No. 2 Dagon and graduated high school from Basic Education High School No. 3 North Dagon. He attended Thanlyin Technological University.

Career

Music career
Yair Yint Aung began his career in 2011 and participated in Bo Bo Entertainment's group albums. He has become popular due to "Lwan Lun Loh" song from the "Bo Bo 1st Anniversary" album, which gained him to nationwide recognition and that song has been one of the all-time hits in his career. In February 2012, he released "A Mone Diary", a duet album with Thar Thar. The album was a commercial success reaching the top of the album charts. The follow-up video album was released on 28 December 2013.

He launched his debut solo album "Chay" on 25 December 2014 which was officially distributed to all parts of Myanmar. The album was spawned more huge hits. The follow-up video album was released on 15 October 2016.

He won the "Best Pop Music Award for Winter" and "Best Pop Album Award" at the 2014 Myanmar Music Awards (MMA). In 2018, he founded the record label YID (Yes I Did), and his next album "G.O.A.T." came out in August 2020.

Acting career
Yair Yint Aung made his acting debut in 2016 with a leading role in the film QC Game, alongside Ei Chaw Po. He then starred in his second film Waiting For You, alongside Nan Su Oo, also in 2016. After this film, he starred in his third film Hae, alongside Thinza Nwe Win and directed by Thar Nyi, released in May 2016.

In 2017, he made his big-screen debut with Nga Ko Nan De Mohndaing (The Storm That Kissed Me) where he played the leading role with Phway Phway and Hlwan Paing which screened in Myanmar cinemas on 1 June 2018. The film was a huge commercial hit slot nationally, topping film ratings and becoming the most watched film at that time. His portrayal of the character Aww Ya Htoo earned praised by fans for his acting performance and character interpretation, and experienced a resurgence of popularity.

In 2018, he starred in comedy film Jin Party, where he played the main role with Yan Aung, Lu Min, Htoo Aung, and Eaindra Kyaw Zin which screened in Myanmar cinemas on 22 August 2019. In 2019, he was cast in horror comedy film Khaw Than and comedy film Yaw Thama Mwe.

Brand Ambassadorships
He was appointed as a brand ambassador of Ve Ve Beverages on 28 February 2015.

Filmography

Film
QC Game (ကြူစီဂိမ်း) (2016)
Waiting For You (2016)
Hae (2016)

Film (Cinema)

Discography

Solo albums 
 Chay (ချေ) (2014)
 G.O.A.T (2020)

Duet albums
A Mone Diary (အမုန်းဒိုင်ယာရီ) (2012)

Awards and nominations

Shae FM Most requesting pop song 
Song Name_Waiting for you

Personal life
Yair Yint Aung has been in a relationship with actress A Nyein Phyu since 2017.

References

External links
 

1993 births
21st-century Burmese male actors
21st-century Burmese male singers
Burmese singer-songwriters
Burmese Theravada Buddhists
People from Yangon
Living people